The 1941 Louisiana Tech Bulldogs football team was an American football team that represented the Louisiana Polytechnic Institute (now known as Louisiana Tech University) as a member of the Louisiana Intercollegiate Conference (LIC) during the 1941 college football season. In their second year under head coach Joe Aillet, the team compiled an overall record of 5–4–1 and won the LIC title with a mark of 5–0.

Schedule

References

Louisiana Tech
Louisiana Tech Bulldogs football seasons
Louisiana Tech Bulldogs football